Karasungur is a village in the Kovancılar District of Elazığ Province in Turkey. Its population is 298 (2021).

References

Villages in Kovancılar District